American Automatic is the first full-length album by Chicago, Illinois based electronic duo Kill Memory Crash, released in 2005 by Ghostly International under the filing number GI-42. The song "Crash V8" is featured in Forza Motorsport 2.

Track listing
Riyout
American Automatic
Crash V8
UTIU	
The O	
Never Forget	
Demento	
Battery	
Push

See also
Electronic music

External links
 American Automatic at Ghostly International

2005 albums
Ghostly International albums